Paul Rivett (born 27 August 1978 in Kent) is a British racing driver who currently competes in the British Touring Car Championship for GKR TradePriceCars.com. He is best known for winning the Renault Clio Cup UK title four times in 2002, 2004, 2011 and 2018 where he has spent most of his career.

Complete British Touring Car Championship results 
(key) (Races in bold indicate pole position – 1 point awarded just in first race; races in italics indicate fastest lap – 1 point awarded all races; * signifies that driver led race for at least one lap – 1 point given all races)

References

External links

1978 births
Living people
British Touring Car Championship drivers
Porsche Carrera Cup GB drivers
British racing drivers
People from Kent
Renault UK Clio Cup drivers
JHR Developments drivers